Harpa costata, common name the ribbed harp, is a species of sea snail, a marine gastropod mollusk in the family Harpidae, the harp snails.

Description
The size of the shell varies between 60 mm and 110 mm.

Distribution
This species is found in the western Indian Ocean, particularly Mauritius and Rodrigues Island.

References

Harpidae
Gastropods described in 1758
Taxa named by Carl Linnaeus